Bathelémont (before 2011: Bathelémont-lès-Bauzemont) is a commune in the Meurthe-et-Moselle department in northeastern France.

Population

Sights

Near Bathelémont is a memorial to the first three U.S. soldiers killed in action in France in World War I. The three men, James Gresham, Thomas Enright, and Merle Hay, of the 16th Infantry, 1st Division, fell on November 3, 1917.

See also
Communes of the Meurthe-et-Moselle department

References

Communes of Meurthe-et-Moselle